The 1965 Kansas City Athletics season was the eleventh for the franchise in Kansas City and the 65th in its overall history.  It involved the A's finishing tenth in the American League with a record of 59 wins and 103 losses, 43 games behind the American League Champion Minnesota Twins. The paid attendance for the season was 528,344, the lowest in the major leagues (and the lowest ever by the A's in Kansas City). The club won 59 games, their worst showing since the A's moved to Kansas City.

Offseason 
 January 20, 1965: Rocky Colavito was traded by the Athletics to the Cleveland Indians as part of a three-team trade. Jim Landis, Mike Hershberger and a player to be named later were sent by the Chicago White Sox to the Athletics. Tommy John, Tommie Agee and Johnny Romano were sent by the Indians to the White Sox, and Cam Carreon was sent by the White Sox to the Indians. The White Sox completed the deal by sending Fred Talbot to the Athletics on February 10.

Regular season 
April 6, 1965: Hank Peters was named General Manager.
The A's lost 21 of their first 26 games. On May 15, manager Mel McGaha was replaced by AAA manager Haywood Sullivan. At the age of 34, Sullivan was the youngest manager in the major leagues.
Owner Charlie Finley steadily built up the team's farm system. He was assisted by the creation of the baseball draft in 1965, which forced young prospects to sign with the team that drafted them—at the price offered by the team—if they wanted to play professional baseball. Thus, Finley was spared from having to compete with wealthier teams for top talent. The Athletics, owners of the worst record in the American League in 1964, had the first pick in the first draft, selecting Rick Monday on June 8, 1965.

Promotions
Club owner Charlie Finley had a pitchometer on the scoreboard. In an attempt to speed up the game, it was a way to measure the time a pitcher spent in between pitches thrown. Finley installed a small zoo in the club picnic area to generate interest in the ball club with small children.
September 8, 1965: The Campy Camp Night promotion was held as Bert Campaneris played every position in the field.
In a promotional move, Finley signed Satchel Paige on September 10, 58 years old at the time, for one game. On September 25, against the Boston Red Sox, Finley invited several Negro league veterans, including Cool Papa Bell, to be introduced before the game. Paige was in the bullpen, sitting on a rocking chair, being served coffee by a "nurse" between innings.  He started the game by getting Jim Gosger out on a pop foul. The next man, Dalton Jones, reached first and went to second on an infield error, but was thrown out trying to reach third on a pitch in the dirt. Carl Yastrzemski doubled and Tony Conigliaro hit a fly ball to end the inning. The next six batters went down in order, including a strikeout of Bill Monbouquette. In the fourth inning, Paige took the mound, to be removed according to plan by Haywood Sullivan. He walked off to a boisterous ovation despite the small crowd of 9,000. The lights dimmed and, led by the PA announcer, the fans lit matches and cigarette lighters while singing "The Old Gray Mare."

Season standings

Record vs. opponents

Notable transactions 
 May 3, 1965: Joe Rudi was selected off waivers from the Athletics by the Cleveland Indians as a first-year waiver pick.
 May 3, 1965: Doc Edwards was traded by the Athletics to the New York Yankees for Johnny Blanchard and Rollie Sheldon.
 May 28, 1965: Don Mossi was signed as a free agent by the Athletics.
 June 8, 1965: 1965 Major League Baseball Draft notable picks:
Round 1: Rick Monday (1st pick). Player signed June 15, 1965.
Round 2: Joe Keough
Round 3: Bob Stinson (did not sign)
Round 4: Pete Koegel
Round 6: Sal Bando
Round 7: Scott Reid (did not sign)
Round 10: George Lauzerique
Round 15: Bobby Brooks
Round 20: Gene Tenace
Round 28: Greg Garrett (did not sign)
 September 10, 1965: Satchel Paige was signed as a free agent by the Athletics.

Roster

Player stats

Batting

Starters by position 
Note: Pos = Position; G = Games played; AB = At bats; H = Hits; Avg. = Batting average; HR = Home runs; RBI = Runs batted in

Other batters 
Note: G = Games played; AB = At bats; H = Hits; Avg. = Batting average; HR = Home runs; RBI = Runs batted in

Pitching

Starting pitchers 
Note: G = Games pitched; IP = Innings pitched; W = Wins; L = Losses; ERA = Earned run average; SO = Strikeouts

Other pitchers 
Note: G = Games pitched; IP = Innings pitched; W = Wins; L = Losses; ERA = Earned run average; SO = Strikeouts

Relief pitchers 
Note: G = Games pitched; W = Wins; L = Losses; SV = Saves; ERA = Earned run average; SO = Strikeouts

Farm system 

LEAGUE CHAMPIONS: Burlington

References

External links
1965 Kansas City Athletics team page at Baseball Reference
1965 Kansas City Athletics team page at www.baseball-almanac.com

Oakland Athletics seasons
Kansas City Athletics season
1965 in sports in Missouri